The Collegiate Rugby Championship (CRC) is an annual college rugby sevens tournament. The CRC is the highest profile college rugby sevens competition in the United States, with the tournament broadcast live on NBC from 2010–2017, on ESPN News and ESPN3 from 2018–2019, The Rugby Network in 2021, and on CBS Sports from 2022. The CRC has capitalized on the surge in popularity of rugby following the 2009 announcement of the addition of rugby sevens to the Summer Olympics. Beginning in 2021, the tournament has been organized by National Collegiate Rugby under license for the name and logo.

Format and qualifying
The tournament has expanded since 16 sides were featured in the inaugural competition, with 32 men's sides competing in the 2021 tournament. The competition has been played over the course of either two or three days. The first day of the tournament features pool matches, with the top teams in each group advancing to the quarterfinals, along with the best second-placed teams. The final day of the tournament is knockout play, featuring the quarterfinals, semifinals and finals.

The majority of the participating teams are invited to the tournament based on the quality of the school's rugby program and on the school's fan appeal. Certain teams also qualify by winning the Southeastern Rugby Conference, the Las Vegas Invitational, and the new Heart of America Tournament.

History
The inaugural 2010 Collegiate Rugby Championship, at the time known as the Collegiate Championship Invitational (CCI), was held in Columbus, Ohio, at the Columbus Crew Stadium. Utah defeated Cal 31–26 in overtime in a thrilling final. Bowling Green's Rocco Mauer led the tournament with 11 tries and was named tournament MVP by Rugby Mag.

The 2011 Collegiate Rugby Championship moved to PPL Park in Philadelphia, PA. NBC increased their coverage over the previous year, devoting 14 hours of coverage to the tournament. California and Arizona were favored after cruising to victories in the first day of pool play, but both were knocked out in quarterfinal upsets. Ultimately, Dartmouth beat Army 32–10 in the final.

Due to the strong support from Philadelphia fans and its Pennsylvania-based title sponsorship, Penn Mutual Life Insurance Company, the CRC remained in Philadelphia until 2021, when it moved to New Orleans. The Gold Mine on Airline again hosted the tournament for the 2022 edition, with television coverage provided by CBS Sports. Having previously been held in late Spring, the 2023 tournament was moved to late April and the venue once again changed to the Maryland SoccerPlex in the Washington D.C. metro area.

Past Results

Men

Men's championships

Appearances

  Champion
  Runner-up
  Semifinals
  Quarterfinals
  Participant

Women

Women's championships

Popularity
The Collegiate Rugby Championship has succeeded in drawing media attention.  NBC recognized that rugby is growing in popularity, participation and interest, and NBC's broadcast of the inaugural 2010 CRC was the first time college rugby had been broadcast live on network TV in the US. The honor of first collegiate try ever scored on broadcast TV belongs to Evan Kaufman of Indiana University. NBC Sports Programming President, Jon Miller, described NBC's support of the Collegiate Rugby Championship, "We're hoping to see continued growth in the ratings and the attendance.  We like the sport a lot, and we've given it a great time period and a real plumb (sic) position on our schedule."
The CRC has posted respectable TV ratings, with the TV audience for the CRC larger than that of the NCAA lacrosse championships.

Due in part to the exposure from NBC's broadcasts, the tournament has attracted several blue chip corporate sponsors, including Geico, Subway, Toyota and Bud Light. The CRC is popular with fans, with over 17,000 fans turning out to watch the 2011 tournament, and over 18,000 fans in attendance at the 2012 tournament. This was followed by a twenty-two percent increase in attendance from 2014 to 2015 totaling 24,813 and an even further increase in 2016 to a total attendance of 27,224. In September 2014, Penn Mutual life insurance company announced a multi-year title sponsorship of the annual championship, which led to the tournament being renamed to the Penn Mutual Collegiate Rugby Championship.

The Collegiate Rugby Championship has sparked a mini revolution in college rugby, prompting scores of schools to begin offering a rugby sevens program. One of the schools that has benefited from the publicity generated by the CRC tournament has been the University of Texas.  Following Texas' participation in the CRC, Texas "raised an additional $10,000 from alumni, landed a new apparel sponsor, and have been contacted by 90 students (including two DBs from the football team) who want to play rugby." The CRC has also given a boost of exposure to lesser known schools with strong rugby programs. For example, when Life University went undefeated in pool play and reached the semifinals of the June 2–3 2012 CRC, Life University's Wikipedia page was viewed by 9,800 people that weekend.

Rivalries
Despite the fact that the CRC tournament has only been around since 2010, the tournament has seen some notable rivalries:
 Army v. Navy – these Service Academy rivals met four times from 2010–16 and 2019, with Navy leading 3–2.
 Texas v. Oklahoma – these Big 12 rivals met in 2011 & 2012, with Texas winning both encounters.
 Cal v. Utah – these Pac-12 rivals met in the knockout rounds of the 2010 & 2011 tournaments, with the underdog Utah upsetting the favored Cal both times.

Notable Past Players and Coaches
The Collegiate Rugby Championship has been notable for its ability to showcase the emerging stars of US rugby. In 2012, representatives from all 12 clubs in the English Premiership (the top professional league in England) attended the CRC, where the Premiership coaches scouted talent from the 16 university teams competing.

The following athletes who have starred in the CRC and made the All Tournament team have gone on to play for the United States national rugby sevens team or United States national rugby union team in international competitions:

Alex Magleby, who became head coach of the United States national rugby sevens team in 2012, was previously head coach of Dartmouth, the team he coached to victory at the 2011 Collegiate Rugby Championship and 2012 Collegiate Rugby Championship.

Leading players

See also
 College rugby
 Division 1-A Rugby
 Intercollegiate sports team champions
 USA Rugby Sevens Collegiate National Championships

References

External links
 

 
Rugby sevens competitions in the United States
College rugby union competitions in the United States
Rugby union
Rugby union in Pennsylvania
Rugby union in Louisiana
Rugby union in Ohio